Bugatti made two V-12 internal combustion piston engines. The first was a quad-turbocharged, 3.5-liter engine, used in their EB 110 sports car, in 1991. The second was a 6.0-liter, naturally-aspirated unit, used in their full-size EB 112 luxury fastback sedan.

Overview

EB 110
The engine is a 60-valve, quad-turbocharged, V12 engine; fed through 12 individual throttle bodies.

B Engineering Edonis

The tuned 3.5-liter Bugatti engine used in the B Engineering Edonis has had its displacement increased from 3,500 cc to 3,760 cc. The original four small IHI turbochargers have been replaced by two larger units from the same manufacturer.

EB 112
The engine featured 5 valves per cylinder, and has a displacement of 6.0-litres opposed to the EB110's 3.5-litres. The engine is placed behind the front wheels, more towards the center of the car inside of the wheelbase to have a much better weight distribution. The EB 112 features permanent all-wheel drive.

Applications
Bugatti EB 110
Bugatti EB 112 (concept)
B Engineering Edonis

References

Bugatti
Gasoline engines by model
Engines by model